Martha Sleeper (June 24, 1910 – March 25, 1983) was a film actress of the 1920s–1930s and, later, a Broadway stage actress. She studied dancing for five years with Russian ballet master, Louis H. Chalif, at his New York dancing studio. Her first public exhibitions were at Carnegie Hall at his class exhibitions.

Family
Sleeper reputedly spent her first years on a sheep ranch in Wyoming. Her father, William B. Sleeper, was an official of the Keith-Albee-Orpheum vaudeville circuit in New York City. Her uncle was John J. Murdock, head of KAO and one of the most powerful men in the business. He had a major impact on her career. Her mother was Minnie Akass. 

Her father retired to Los Angeles, California, in 1923 due to ill health. Martha was under contract to Hal Roach studios beginning in 1924, when she was 14 years old. Her father was found dead of heart disease on September 1, 1925, in bed at his home. Sleeper, then 15 years old, with her mother and sister, were away, having taken a short trip to New York City.

Acting career

Sleeper's film career began in 1923 and continued until 1945. Her first screen appearance, at the age of 12, was in The Mailman (1923), an independent production. After appearing in several kiddie comedies at the Christie studio she was signed by the Hal Roach studio for the Our Gang series but she quickly outgrew that role, leaving it shortly after her 14th birthday. 

From 1925 to 1927 she appeared in comedies playing opposite the studio's most popular male stars. She developed into a very inventive comedienne, with an animated face of many comic expressions -- especially in the Charley Chase short The Rat's Knuckles (Martha's a waitress, registering confusion when a customer pours an entire bottle of soda on his sandwich) and in the Max Davidson short Pass the Gravy (Martha, imitating a chicken, thinks she has laid an egg!). Many of her early comedies were directed by Leo McCarey.

In 1927, Sleeper was one of 13 actresses selected as a WAMPAS Baby Star, one of the year's feminine personalities whom exhibitors thought had a promising future in feature films. Late that year she left the Roach studios -- which made only short-subject comedies -- and signed with the FBO studio. FBO introduced Sleeper and Bryant Washburn as a new comedy team. In 1928-29 she starred in six silent features. With the coming of sound she was signed by MGM and placed in their training program.  

From 1930 to 1936 she played many supporting roles in melodramas, her role typically that of a well-bred and somewhat snobbish society woman who loses her man to the film's leading lady. Frustrated by the types of roles she was being offered, Sleeper began playing in local stage productions, at one point drawing raves as Eliza Doolittle in a performance of Pygmalion in 1932.  

After appearing in some low-budget melodramas for Monogram studio, Sleeper and her husband, actor Hardie Albright, left Hollywood for New York in 1936  where Sleeper began a long run in both on- and off-Broadway plays. Her first Broadway play was Good Men and True (1934). In 1945, as a favor to her Hal Roach director Leo McCarey, Sleeper played the role of Patsy's mother in The Bells of St. Mary's. It was her last screen role. In 1945, after appearing in The Bells of St, Mary's, Martha returned to New York and played Spencer Tracy's wife in the Broadway play The Rugged Path.

Business career
While In New York, she turned a hobby into a thriving business, finding herself at the forefront of a fashion craze for "gadget jewelry" in the late 1930s. She had designed and manufactured whimsical pieces of costume jewelry for herself, but soon other women saw these pieces and wanted to know where they could obtain a copy. Martha found a company that would manufacture her designs, and they soon became available in department stores around the country, generating Martha a substantial sideline income in addition to her stage work. Many of these pieces were manufactured using Bakelite; these pieces are now considered valuable collectibles. 

In 1949, she and her second husband were on an extended cruise in the Caribbean. Her destination was the Virgin Islands and a vacation with her husband; however, when she reached Puerto Rico, she fell in love with the island. Terminating the cruise, Martha and her husband took up permanent residence in San Juan. Looking for a new challenge, and no longer interested in jewelry design, she reinvented herself and began designing women's clothing and resort wear. She had her designs manufactured locally and sold them through a boutique that she established in a 300-year-old building in Old Town San Juan. She won many awards and commissions from large corporations for unique designs. She operated this business from 1950 until her retirement in 1969. In 1969, married her third husband and left San Juan for Beaufort, South Carolina, where she spent her remaining years.

Death
Sleeper died of a heart attack, aged 72, in Beaufort, South Carolina, where she had lived with her third husband, Col. Howard C. Stelling, who survived her. She had no children.

Former discrepancies regarding Martha Sleeper's year of birth
Many sources had cited 1907 as Sleeper's year of birth, but she was actually born shortly after the 1910 census was taken in April 1910. Martha's true date of birth is June 24, 1910, as verified by a copy of her birth certificate.

No "Martha Sleeper" appears in the 1910 census records; however, a "Martha Sleeper" is listed as 9 years old in the 1920 census (April 1920) and 19 years old in the 1930 census (April 1930). An airline passenger list, flight CBA 611 from St. Maarten to Charlotte Amalie, VI, on 10 Sep 1962, gives a birthdate of 6-24-1910, in Illinois (ancestry.com). A U.K. Incoming Passenger list (ancestry.com) for the RMS Queen Elizabeth, from New York to Southamptom, arriving 19 Aug 1958, gives a birthdate of 24.6.10. The Social Security Death Index records the date of birth of a "Martha Stelling" (Sleeper's third husband's surname) who died in March 1983 in Beaufort County, South Carolina, as June 24, 1910. Sleeper's 1983 New York Times obituary, as well, was titled "Martha Sleeper Is Dead At 72."

Filmography

References

Bibliography
Hayward Daily Review, Silent Film Dream Gal Found in Puerto Rico, May 27, 1955, Page 24.
Los Angeles Times, Her Youth No Bar To Mature Roles, May 10, 1925, Page 18.
Los Angeles Times, Keith-Orpheum Former Official Succumbs Here, September 2, 1925, Page A3.
Los Angeles Times, Here and There, October 29, 1926, Page A8.
Oakland Tribune, Comedienne Writes, Sunday, October 31, 1926, p. W3.

External links
 

1910 births
1983 deaths
20th-century American actresses
Actresses from Illinois
American silent film actresses
American film actresses
People from Lake Bluff, Illinois
People from San Juan, Puerto Rico
20th-century American businesspeople
WAMPAS Baby Stars
American stage actresses